= Kurniwadi =

- Village
- Country: India
- State: Karnataka
- District: Belgaum

Languages
  - Official: Kannada
- Time zone: UTC+5:30 (IST)
- ISO 3166 code: IN-KA

Kurniwadi is a village in Belgaum district in Karnataka, India.

Kuraniwadi is a small village with a population of about 2000. Most of the families depended on agriculture. The villagers mainly grow soybean, cotton, corn, sugar cane, peanuts and varieties of vegetables. Farmers also plant commercial crops like guava and papaya. The crops grown here are sent to the Belgaum city for sale.

Kuraniwadi is also known for its temples, Allam Prabhu, is being worshiped by the people and followed by Shri Mallikarjun, Laxmi Devi, Basavanna etc. Kuraniwadi is also known for Bajana.
